Mauro Crismanich (born February 20, 1984) is an Argentine taekwondo athlete.

Biography
Mauro Crismanich was born in Corrientes, Corrientes Province, into a Croatian immigrant family Crismanich.
His brother, Sebastian is also a well-known taekwondo practitioner who won  the gold medal in the men's 80 kg division at the 2012 Summer Olympics.

References

External links
 Profile from The-Sports.org

1984 births
Living people
Argentine male taekwondo practitioners
Taekwondo practitioners at the 2007 Pan American Games
Argentine people of Croatian descent
World Taekwondo Championships medalists
Pan American Games competitors for Argentina
21st-century Argentine people